Imran Janat is an Afghan cricketer. He made his List A debut for Afghanistan A against Zimbabwe A during their tour to Zimbabwe on 27 January 2017. He made his Twenty20 debut for Kabul Eagles in the 2017 Shpageeza Cricket League on 16 September 2017. He made his first-class debut for Band-e-Amir Region in the 2017–18 Ahmad Shah Abdali 4-day Tournament on 20 October 2017.

He was the leading run-scorer for Kabul Region in the 2018 Ahmad Shah Abdali 4-day Tournament, with 651 runs in eight matches.

In September 2018, he was named in Nangarhar's squad in the first edition of the Afghanistan Premier League tournament.

References

External links
 

Year of birth missing (living people)
Living people
Afghan cricketers
Place of birth missing (living people)
Band-e-Amir Dragons cricketers
Kabul Eagles cricketers
Mis Ainak Knights cricketers
Nangarhar Leopards cricketers